The woodpecker finch (Camarhynchus pallidus) is a monomorphic species of bird in the Darwin's finch group of the tanager family, Thraupidae endemic to the Galapagos Islands. The diet of a woodpecker finch revolves mostly around invertebrates, but also encompasses a variety of seeds. Woodpecker finches, like many other species of birds, form breeding pairs and care for young until they have fledged. The most distinctive characteristic of woodpecker finches is their ability to use tools for foraging. This behaviour indicates that they have highly specialized cognitive abilities. Woodpecker finches have also shown the ability to learn new behaviours regarding tool use via social learning. Not all populations of woodpecker finches use tools equally as often, as this is influenced by the environment in which they live.

Description 

Woodpecker finches range in weight from 23g to 29g and are about 15 cm long. Although their tongues are quite short, they have a relatively long bill compared to other species of Darwin's finches.

Distribution 
Woodpecker finches are native to the Galapagos Islands. They are commonly found on the islands of Isabela, Santa Cruz, San Cristobal, Fernandina, Santiago, and Penzón. They occupy all areas of the islands, from the most arid zones to more humid zones. However, the density of woodpecker finches is greater in the more humid zones than in the drier ones. Woodpecker finches are also found at a variety of altitudes, from sea level to higher inland elevations. They are a not a migratory species and when they do fly, they only fly short distances.

Diet 
Woodpecker finch diets mainly consist of arthropods found in and around crevices in trees. They eat both adult insects and larvae, which are often located within trees and shrubs. Their habit of pecking at branches is similar to a woodpecker's drumming on a tree trunk. Wood-boring beetle larvae are a staple of their diet. They also often feed on moths, caterpillars and crickets. Another significant part of their diet includes fruit and seeds, making woodpecker finches important dispersers.

Foraging behaviour 
One of the most distinguishable traits of Camarhynchus pallidus is its ability to use a twig, stick, or cactus spine as a tool. This behaviour earned it the nicknames tool-using finch, and carpenter finch. The finch manipulates the tool to dislodge invertebrate prey, such as grubs, from crevices in trees. It has been hypothesized that due to the absence of woodpeckers, woodpecker finches filled a similar niche on the Galapagos Islands. Woodpeckers have strong bills for drilling and drumming on trees, as well as long sticky tongues for extracting food. On the isolated Galapagos islands, without competition from South American woodpecker species, the woodpecker finch was able to adapt, and evolve its tool-utilizing capability to compensate for its short tongue. The ability to use tools is a highly specialized cognitive ability as it involves the animal creating and recognizing a relationship between two foreign objects found in its environment.

Woodpecker finches are capable of using a variety of materials to construct the tools they use. They are capable of modifying the tools they find in order to maximize their efficiency. Scientists have observed finches shortening the length of sticks or cactus spines in order to make them more manageable for tool use. The same tool can be used multiple times and on different trees. Woodpecker finches may also try various sticks or spines at one site before finding one that can reach and extract the prey item. There is conflicting evidence of whether or not this behaviour was acquired through social learning, as juveniles have been observed using tools without previous contact with adults. In contrast, juvenile woodpecker finches have also been observed utilizing novel tools made from non-native plant species, such as blackberry bushes. After observing adult woodpecker finches prep barbed twigs and use them to obtain prey from crevices in trees, juvenile finches displayed the same behaviour with the novel tool. These observations contrasted previous studies to show that social learning may occur in wild woodpecker finch populations.

The frequency of tool use by woodpecker finches depends largely on whether they live in a more wet or dry environment. Woodpecker finches that live in more wet environments seldom use tools as prey is much more abundant. In contrast, they employ tool use much more when living in dry areas. During the dry season, woodpecker finches use tools while foraging to acquire up to 50% of their prey. The use of tools has allowed woodpecker finches to be able to obtain prey that they would otherwise be unable to reach with their short tongues. It is thought that this behaviour came to evolve due to the harshness of the dry and unstable environmental conditions of the Galapagos Islands.

Reproduction 
There are no morphological differences between either sex in woodpecker finches, as they are monomorphic. Woodpecker finches mainly use moss, lichens, and grass as building materials for their nests. During the 2 week incubation period when females are sitting on the eggs, males linger nearby, often feeding the females. Female woodpecker finches typically lay around 2-3 eggs. Both males and females participate in the feeding of the chicks from the day they hatch until well after they have become independent. Woodpecker finch chicks will fledge around 2 weeks after hatching.

References

External links

woodpecker finch
Endemic birds of the Galápagos Islands
Tool-using animals
woodpecker finch
woodpecker finch
woodpecker finch
Taxobox binomials not recognized by IUCN